The BSFA Awards are given every year by the British Science Fiction Association. The BSFA Award for Best Artwork is open to any artwork with speculative themes that first appeared in the previous year. Provided the artwork hasn't been published before it doesn't matter where it appears. The ceremonies are named after the year that the eligible works were published, despite the awards being given out in the next year.

Prior to 1986 the award was presented for best artist, rather than artwork. Jim Burns won three of the seven Best Artist awards. He went on to win eleven Best Artwork awards.

Winners

1979: Jim Burns 
1980: Peter Jones
1981: Bruce Pennington
1982: Tim White
1983: Bruce Pennington
1984: Jim Burns
1985: Jim Burns
1986: Keith Roberts - cover of The Clocktower Girl
1987: Jim Burns - cover of Worldcon Programme Book
1988: Alan Lee - cover of Lavondyss by Robert Holdstock
1989: Jim Burns - cover of Other Edens III
1990: Ian Miller - covers of The Difference Engine and Interzone 40
1991: Mark Harrison - cover of Interzone 45
1992: Jim Burns - cover of Hearts, Hands and Voices
1993: Jim Burns - cover of Red Dust by Paul J. McAuley
1994: Jim Burns - cover of Interzone 79
1995: Jim Burns – cover of Seasons of Plenty
1996: Jim Burns – cover of Ancient Shores
1997: SMS – The Black Blood of the Dead, cover of Interzone 116
1998: Jim Burns – Lord Prestimion, cover of Interzone 138
1999: Jim Burns – cover of Darwinia
2000: Dominic Harman – Hideaway, cover of Interzone 157)
2001: Colin Odell – cover of Omegatropic
2002: Dominic Harman – cover of Interzone 179
2003: Colin Odell – cover of The True Knowledge of Ken MacLeod
2004: Stephan Martinière – cover of Newton's Wake (US edition) 
2005: Pawel Lewandowski – cover of Interzone 200
2006: Christopher "Fangorn" Baker – 'Angelbot', cover of Time Pieces
2007: Andy Bigwood – 'Cracked World', cover of disLocations
2008: Andy Bigwood – cover of Subterfuge
2009: Stephan Martinière, cover of Desolation Road (US edition)
2010: Joey Hi-Fi – cover of Zoo City
2011: Dominic Harman - cover of Ian Whates' The Noise Revealed 
2012: Blacksheep - cover of Adam Roberts's Jack Glass 
2013: Joey Hi-Fi – cover of Tony Ballantyne's Dream London 
2014: Tessa Farmer - installation inspired by The Wasp Factory from Iain Banks
2015: Jim Burns - cover of Pelquin's Comet
2016: Sarah Anne Langton – cover of Lavie Tidhar's Central Station 
2017: Jim Burns and Victo Ngai
2018: Likhain - In the Vanishers’ Palace: Dragon I and II 
2019: Chris "Fangorn" Baker – cover of Wourism and Other Stories by Ian Whates (Luna Press)
2020: Iain Clark - Shipbuilding Over the Clyde - art for Glasgow 2024 WorldCon bid
2021: Iain Clark - Glasgow Green Woman - art for Glasgow 2024 WorldCon bid

Best Artist/Artwork nominees

1979

Jim Burns 
Chris Foss 
John Harris 
Peter Lord 
Tony Roberts 
Patrick Woodroffe

1980
Peter Jones 
Brian Bolland 
Carlos Ezquerra 
Peter Goodfellow 
Chris Moore 
Tim White

1981
Bruce Pennington 
Chris Achilleos 
Pete Lyon 
Chris Moore 
Tim White

1982
Tim White 
Peter Goodfellow 
Peter Jones 
Bruce Pennington

1983
Bruce Pennington 
Peter Jones 
Ian Miller 
Tim White

1984
Jim Burns 
Peter Jones 
Ian Miller 
Bruce Pennington 
Tim White

1985
Jim Burns 
Peter Jones 
Rodney Matthews 
Ian Miller 
Tim White

...

2009
Nitzan Klamer - alternate cover for 20,000 Leagues Under the Sea
Stephen Martinière - cover for Desolation Road by Ian McDonald (Pyr)
Stephanie Pui-Min Law - Emerald
Adam Tredowski - cover for Interzone 220
Adam Tredowski - cover for Interzone 224
Adam Tredowski - cover for Interzone 225

2010
Andy Bigwood – cover for Conflicts' (Newcon Press)
Charlie Harbour – cover for Fun With Rainbows by Gareth Owens (Immersion Press)
Dominic Harman – cover for The Cat's Cradle by Kurt Vonnegut (Gollancz)
Joey Hi-Fi -cover for Zoo City by Lauren Beukes (Angry Robot)
Ben Greene – A Deafened Plea for Peace, cover for Crossed Genres 21
Adam Tredowski – cover for Finch by Jeff VanderMeer (Corvus)

2011
Dominic Harman - cover for Ian Whates' The Noise Revealed (Solaris)
Jim Kay - cover and illustrations of Patrick Ness' A Monster Calls (Walker)
Pedro Marques - cover for Lavie Tidhar's Osama (PS Publishing)
Anne Sudworth - cover for Liz Williams' A Glass of Shadow (Newcon Press)

2012
Ben Baldwin - cover for Dark Currents (Newcon Press)
Blacksheep - cover for Adam Roberts' Jack Glass (Gollancz)
Dominic Harman - cover for Eric Brown's Helix Wars (Rebellion)
Joey Hi-Fi - cover for Simon Morden's Thy Kingdom Come (Jurassic London)
Si Scott - cover artwork for Chris Beckett's Dark Eden (Corvus)

2013
Joey Hi-Fi - cover for Tony Ballantyne's Dream London (Solaris)
Kevin Tong - poster for Metropolis (tragicsunshine.com)
Richard Wagner - The Angel at the Heart of the Rain (Interzone #246)

2014
Tessa Farmer - The Wasp Factoryblacksheep-uk - cover for Bête by Adam Roberts
Andy Potts - cover for Mars Evacuees by Sophia McDougall
Richard Anderson - cover for The Mirror Empire by Kameron Hurley
Jeffrey Alan Love - cover for Wolves  by John Fleskes

...

2018
Ben Baldwin - wraparound cover for Strange Tales slipcase set (NewCon Press)
Joey Hi-Fi - cover for Paris Adrift by E.J. Swift (Solaris)
Sarah Anne Langton - cover for Unholy Land by Lavie Tidhar (Tachyon)
Sing Yun Lee & Morris Wild - artwork for Sublime Cognition conference (London Science Fiction Research Community)
Likhain - “In the Vanishers’ Palace: Dragon I and II” (Inprnt)
Bede Rogerson - cover for Concrete Faery by Elizabeth Priest (Luna Press)
Del Samatar - artwork for Monster Portraits by Del Samatar & Sofia Samatar (Rose Metal)
Charlotte Stroomer - cover for Rosewater by Tade Thompson (Orbit Books)

2019
Aitch & Rachel Vale – cover for Deeplight by Frances Hardinge (UK edition) (Macmillan Children’s Books)
Chris Baker (Fangorn) – cover for Wourism and Other Stories by Ian Whates (Luna Press)
Julia Lloyd – cover for Fleet of Knives by Gareth L Powell (Titan Books)
Charlotte Stroomer – cover for The Rosewater Redemption by Tade Thompson (Orbit Books)
Richard Wagner – cover for Interzone 284

2020
Chris Baker (Fangorn) - covers for Robot Dreams series (NewCon Press)
Iain Clark - Shipbuilding Over the Clyde art for Glasgow 2024 WorldCon bid
Ruby Gloom - cover for Club Ded by Nikil Singh (Luna Press)
Sinjin Li - cover for A Strange and Brilliant Light by Eli Lee (Jo Fletcher Books)
Nani Walker - Four Black Lives Matter Murals (Los Angeles Times)

2021
Iain Clark - Glasgow Green Woman art for Glasgow 2024 WorldCon bid
Elena Betti - cover for Saving Shadows by Eugen Bacon (NewCon Press)
Maria Spada - cover of The Year’s Best African Speculative Fiction edited by Oghenechovwe Donald Ekpeki
Peter Lo/Kara Walker - cover of Danged Black Thing by Eugen Bacon (Transit Lounge Publishing)
Dan Dos Santos/Lauren Panepinto - cover of Son of the Storm'' by Suyi Davies Okungbowa (Orbit)

External links
 Official website

References

Artwork
Awards established in 1979
1979 establishments in the United Kingdom
Book art awards